Eucalyptus assimilans is a tree that is endemic to Western Australia. It has smooth white or greyish bark shed in long ribbons, lance-shaped and curved leaves, buds in groups of seven in leaf axils and conical fruit.

Description
It has smooth white or greyish bark on the trunk and branches, that is shed in long, wide pale brown strips. The bark, leaves and flower buds are covered with a greyish, powdery bloom. Young plants and coppice regrowth have egg-shaped to broadly lance-shaped leaves.

Taxonomy and naming
Eucalyptus assimilans was first formally described in 2001 by Lawrie Johnston and Ken Hill. The specific epithet (assimilans) is a Latin word meaning "making like", referring to the similarity of this species to E. sheathiana.

Distribution
This eucalypt grows sporadically in woodland in gently undulating country in the Balladonia area in the Coolgardie biogeographic region.

Conservation
Eucalyptus assimilans is classified as "not threatened" by the Western Australian Government Department of Parks and Wildlife.

See also

List of Eucalyptus species

References

Eucalypts of Western Australia
Trees of Australia
assimilans
Myrtales of Australia
Plants described in 2001
Taxa named by Lawrence Alexander Sidney Johnson
Taxa named by Ken Hill (botanist)